MX Player is an Indian video streaming and video on demand platform,developed by MX Media (formerly J2 Interactive). It has over 280 million users globally. The platform currently operates on an ad-supported model.This video streaming app has a streaming library of over 150,000 hours in 11 languages. It is available on iOS, Android and the web.

In 2018, Times Internet acquired a majority stake in MX Player for $140 million.

In October 2019, MX Player raised $110.8 million in an investment led by Chinese conglomerate Tencent.

History

Video player
MX Player was launched as a video player on 18 July 2011. It featured subtitle support and offline video viewing capabilities.

OTT platform 
On 20 February 2019, MX Player was relaunched as an OTT platform with original programming. It has also licensed contents from various Indian and International studios including FilmRise, Sonar Entertainment, Screen Media Films, Goldmine, Hungama, Shemaroo, Paramount Pictures, Sony Entertainment and Sun TV Network. In 2020, it tied up with Ullu App for adult content.

International expansion 
Initially available only in India, in March 2020, MX Player announced the launch of its OTT service internationally to select markets, including the United States, United Kingdom,Australia, New Zealand, Pakistan, Bangladesh and Nepal. Elsewhere, it is still a video player.

Potential acquisition by Amazon 
In February 2023, it was reported that Amazon is in talks to acquire MX Player as part of a broader effort to expand its presence in the Indian entertainment market.

List of original shows

MX TakaTak 
In July 2020, MX Player launched the short video app MX TakaTak. As of 24 March 2021, the app has more than 100 million active users.
MX Takatak to merge with ShareChat’s Moj to create India's largest short video platform

References

Android (operating system) software
Indian entertainment websites
Video on demand services
Companies of The Times Group
2018 mergers and acquisitions
2011 establishments in Maharashtra